Manjhanpur is a town, nagar palika and the district headquarters of Kaushambi district in the Indian state of Uttar Pradesh. It is very old Town.
There are so many autos, taxis& buses are available to reach Bharwari railway station.
Manjhanpur also has several Quality Hospital. District Hospital and several hospital are equipped with state of art technology. 
A newly inaugurated bus stop has started the services of transportation , it is well connected with Allahabad, Rajapur, chitrakoot, Kanpur etc.

Religious Sites 
Manjhanpur has KARBALA which is impeccable in its architecture. Number of people gathers in the karbala at the time of muharram festival. People perform several rituals and functions during this time. People of every faith visit KARBALA to enjoy picturesque atmosphere. It has garden in which several flowers are planted.

Manjhanpur has Durga Mandir in which number of people offer prayer everyday. Mela is performed by the locals and mandir committee once in a year. People in large number come during  these time to offer Puja and Aarti.

Maulana Ehsan Ali Mazaar is situated in Manjhanpur. People from across the country come here to do ziyarat. Mostly the people of West Bengal are coming at the time of URS to do ziyarat. During this time mela is also performed and people of all faith come to have ziyarat.

Political Field 
State Legislative Council Constituency- Manjhanpur

Member of MLC - Indrajeet Saroj

Lok Sabha Constituency- Kaushambi

Member of Lok Sabha- Vinod Kumar Sonkar

Facilities 
Hospital

Manjhanpur is famous for its healthcare facilities within the district. Specialist doctors of every field provide services to people.

Manjhanpur has Primary Health Care Centre and District Hospital. District Hospital has numerous facilities for patients and also it imparts training to practitioner. There are large number of Private Hospital which provides services to patients.

Transportation

Bus stop ,which is situated near to District Hospital, is well connected to Rajapur, Chitrakoot, Allahabad, Varanasi and Kanpur. It is inaugurated recently. Also there are Tempo Bus Stand near District Hospital provides facility of transportation to nearby areas.

Education

Shri Durga Devi Inter College is the oldest school of Manjhanpur, which offers education upto 12 class. It is established before Independence of India. Apart from this, there are other colleges and Schools which are famous like: MV Convest School, Darul Uloom Ehsaniya, BP Public School etc.

Sports

Multi Sports Stadium is situated near to manjhanpur which provides opportunity to everyone. Tournaments and Sports activity are Performed on timely basis to engage public in sports.

Food

Osa Mandi is situated near to District Hospital. It does the transaction of fruits, cereals, dal and other essential food stuff.

Demographics
 India census, Manjhanpur had a population of 16,457. Males constitute 53% of the population and females 47%. Manjhanpur has an average literacy rate of 68.18%, lower than the national average of 74.04%: male literacy is 74.37%, and female literacy is 61.2%. In Manjhanpur, 15% of the population are under six years of age.

References

Cities and towns in Kaushambi district